The Day & Zimmermann is a privately held company in the fields of construction, engineering, staffing and ammunition manufacture, operating out of 150 locations worldwide.  Its corporate office is at 1500 Spring Garden Street in Philadelphia, Pennsylvania.

Day & Zimmermann has an annual revenue of $2.5 billion, and is ranked by Forbes as one of the largest privately held companies in the United States.

History

Early years 
The company was founded in 1901 by Charles Day and Kern Dodge, son of James Mapes Dodge, as Dodge & Day, specializing in engineering, shop equipment and management. Later, the scope of the organization was enlarged to include a great deal of engineering and construction work in both the industrial and public-service fields.

In 1907 another former classmate John Zimmerman joined the firm as partner, and they renamed the firm Dodge, Day & Zimmermann. After Kern Dodge withdrew as partner in 1911 the firm became Day & Zimmermann, incorporated in 1916,

In its early years the company came into prominence with the design of the construction of the Gatun Lock System, one of the Panama Canal locks in 1907. The construction of the Gatun Lock began with the first concrete laid at Gatun, on August 24, 1909, by  Day & Zimmermann. In 1914, the company was contracted by the Hershey chocolate company to produce the foil wrapping machines for Hershey's Kisses.

Merger with Yoh Services and later years  
In 1961, Day & Zimmermann and Yoh Company merged, with Harold L. Yoh becoming president of Day & Zimmerman. In the early 1970s it assisted in the construction of Veteran's Stadium in Philadelphia.

In 1976, Spike Yoh bought the company from his father and was the CEO for twenty-two years. He graduated from Duke University and one of Duke's facilities is named Duke's Yoh Football Center. In 1998, his son, Hal Yoh, became the company's leader. In that year Day & Zimmermann was the recipient of the National Family Business of the Year award.  

One of America's leading producers of ammunition, the company operates several government-owned facilities. In the 2011 financial year, it worked on 351 US Army contracts worth 151.8 million dollars.

Selected publications
 Jeffrey L. Rodengen, Jon VanZile, Sandy Cruz, The Legend of Day & Zimmermann, 2001.
 H. Birchard Taylor, Charles Day (1879-1931) Symbol of American Industrial Genius. Newcomen Society of North America, 1953.
 Harold L. Yoh, Day & Zimmermann, Inc: Dedicated to Excellence for Eighty Years, 1901-1981, Newcomen Society in North America, 1981.

References

Ammunition manufacturers
Defense companies of the United States
Manufacturing companies based in Pennsylvania
Privately held companies based in Pennsylvania
Companies based in Philadelphia
Manufacturing companies established in 1901
1901 establishments in the United States